Paul Campion (born 10 November 1969 in Sarina, Queensland) is an Australian radio host and recipient of the Australian Commercial Radio Award for best music personality, in 2013 Paul was acknowledged at the Australian Commercial Radio Awards for 25 Years service to the industry . He is currently breakfast presenter on River 94.9 in Ipswich . Paul is the older brother of former professional rugby league footballer Kevin Campion.

Campion started his career in 1987 at Radio 4MK Mackay. Campions early years were spent learning his trade working at country and regional radio stations including 4VL,4BU and 4GR before arriving at Sea FM on the Gold Coast in 1992.

In 1994 Campion joined 2Day FM Sydney as an on-air presenter . With Austereo He had stints in Perth on the relaunch of MMM in 1996 and as Drive presenter and on Drive time at Austereo network station B105 Brisbane. At the time Campion achieved the highest ratings figures in Austereo history.

In October 2001 Campion moved as the inaugural breakfast host of new DMG ARN partnership 97.3 FM. He then shuffled to become the drive presenter in 2004 a role he presented until 2015 before moving to River 94.9 Ipswich where he currently hosts and produces the Marnie and Campo Breakfast program . Campion received from AFTRS a graduate certificate in Radio programming in 2003. Academically Paul has been a QUT mentor for media, communication and journalism students in Brisbane as well as a studying as a Philosophy masters candidate.

Paul is married to Lea and has two children Sam and Georgia

References

External links 
 The Official 97.3FM Website
 The Official River 94.9 Website

1969 births
Living people
Australian radio personalities
People from Brisbane